The 23rd Annual Grammy Awards were held on February 25, 1981, at Radio City Music Hall in New York City and were broadcast live on American television. They recognized accomplishments by musicians from the year 1980.

Album of the Year went to Michael Omartian and Christopher Cross for Christopher Cross, Record and Song of the Year went to Christopher Cross for "Sailing". Cross was the first artist in Grammy history to win all four General Field awards in a single ceremony, bringing home Record of the Year, Album of the Year, Song of the Year, and Best New Artist.

Award winners
Record of the Year
Michael Omartian (producer) & Christopher Cross for "Sailing"
Album of the Year
Michael Omartian (producer) & Christopher Cross for Christopher Cross
Song of the Year
Christopher Cross for "Sailing"
Best New Artist
Christopher Cross

Children's
Best Recording for Children
David Levine & Lucy Simon (producers) for In Harmony: A Sesame Street Record performed by various artists

Classical
Best Classical Orchestral Recording
Raymond Minshull (producer), Georg Solti (conductor) & the Chicago Symphony Orchestra for Bruckner: Symphony No. 6 in A
Best Classical Vocal Soloist Performance
Henry Lewis (conductor), Leontyne Price & the Philharmonia Orchestra for Prima Donna, Vol. 5 - Great Soprano Arias From Handel to Britten
Best Opera Recording
Gunther Breest, Michael Horwath (producers), Pierre Boulez (conductor), Toni Blankenheim,  Franz Mazura, Yvonne Minton,  Teresa Stratas  & the Orchestre de l'Opera de Paris for Berg: Lulu
Best Choral Performance, Classical
Carlo Maria Giulini (conductor), Norbert Balatsch (chorus master) & the Philharmonia Orchestra & Chorus for Mozart: Requiem
 Best Classical Performance- Instrumental Soloist or Soloists (with orchestra)
Bernard Haitink (conductor), Itzhak Perlman, Mstislav Rostropovich & the Concertgebouw Orchestra for Brahms: Violin and Cello Concerto in A Minor (Double Concerto)
Seiji Ozawa (conductor),  Itzhak Perlman & the Boston Symphony Orchestra for Berg: Violin Concerto/Stravinsky: Violin Concerto in D
Best Classical Performance - Instrumental Soloist or Soloists (without orchestra)
Itzhak Perlman for The Spanish Album
Best Chamber Music Performance
Itzhak Perlman & Pinchas Zukerman for Music for Two Violins (Moszkowski: Suite For Two Violins/Shostakovich: Duets/Prokofiev: Sonata for Two Violins)
Best Classical Album
Gunther Breest, Michael Horwath (producers), Pierre Boulez (conductor), Toni Blankenheim, Franz Mazura, Yvonne Minton, Teresa Stratas, & the Orchestre de l'Opera de Paris for Berg: Lulu

Comedy
Best Comedy Recording
Rodney Dangerfield for No Respect

Composing and arranging
Best Instrumental Composition
John Williams (composer) for The Empire Strikes Back
Best Album of Original Score Written for a Motion Picture or a Television Special
John Williams (composer) for The Empire Strikes Back
Best Instrumental Arrangement
Jerry Hey & Quincy Jones (arrangers) for "Dinorah, Dinorah" performed by George Benson
Best Arrangement Accompanying Vocalist(s)
Christopher Cross & Michael Omartian (arrangers) for "Sailing" performed by Christopher Cross
Best Arrangement for Voices
Janis Siegel (arranger) for "Birdland" performed by The Manhattan Transfer

Country
Best Country Vocal Performance, Female
Anne Murray for "Could I Have This Dance?"
Best Country Vocal Performance, Male
George Jones for "He Stopped Loving Her Today"
Best Country Vocal Performance by a Duo or Group
Emmylou Harris & Roy Orbison for "That Lovin' You Feelin' Again"
Best Country Instrumental Performance
Gilley's Urban Cowboy Band for "Orange Blossom Special/Hoedown"
Best Country Song
Willie Nelson (songwriter) for "On the Road Again"

Folk
Best Ethnic or Traditional Recording
Norman Dayron (producer) for Rare Blues performed by various artists

Gospel
Best Gospel Performance, Traditional
Blackwood Brothers for We Come to Worship
Best Gospel Performance, Contemporary or Inspirational
The Archers, Cynthia Clawson, Andrae Crouch, Tramaine Hawkins, Walter Hawkins, Dony McGuire, Reba Rambo & B.J. Thomas for The Lord's Prayer
Best Soul Gospel Performance, Traditional
James Cleveland & the Charles Fold Singers for Lord, Let Me Be an Instrument
Best Soul Gospel Performance, Contemporary
Shirley Caesar for Rejoice
Best Inspirational Performance
Debby Boone for With My Song I Will Praise Him

Historical
Best Historical Reissue Album
Keith Hardwick (producer) for Segovia - The EMI Recordings 1927-39

Jazz
Best Jazz Vocal Performance, Female
Ella Fitzgerald for A Perfect Match
Best Jazz Vocal Performance, Male
George Benson for "Moody's Mood"
Best Jazz Instrumental Performance, Soloist
Bill Evans for I Will Say Goodbye
Best Instrumental Jazz Performance, Group
Bill Evans for We Will Meet Again
Best Instrumental Jazz Performance, Big Band
Count Basie for On the Road
Best Jazz Fusion Performance, Vocal or Instrumental
The Manhattan Transfer for "Birdland"

Latin
Best Latin Recording
Cal Tjader for La Onda Va Bien

Musical show
Best Cast Show Album
Andrew Lloyd Webber (producer and composer), Tim Rice (producer and lyricist) & the original cast with Patti Lupone & Mandy Patinkin for Evita - Premier American Recording

Packaging and notes
Best Album Package
Roy Kohara (art director) for Against the Wind performed by Bob Seger & The Silver Bullet Band
Best Album Notes
David McClintick (notes writer) for Trilogy: Past, Present and Future performed by Frank Sinatra

Pop
Best Pop Vocal Performance, Female
The Rose-Bette Midler
Best Pop Vocal Performance, Male
This Is It-Kenny Loggins
Best Pop Performance by a Duo or Group with Vocal
Guilty-Barbra Streisand & Barry Gibb
Best Pop Instrumental Performance
One on One-Bob James & Earl Klugh

Production and engineering
Best Engineered Recording, Non-Classical
James Guthrie (engineer) for The Wall performed by Pink Floyd
Best Engineered Recording, Classical
Karl-August Naegler (engineer), Pierre Boulez (conductor)  & the Orchestre de l'Opera de Paris for Berg: Lulu (Complete Version)
Producer of the Year, (Non-Classical)
Phil Ramone
Classical Producer of the Year
Robert Woods

R&B
Best R&B Vocal Performance, Female
Stephanie Mills for "Never Knew Love Like This Before"
Best R&B Vocal Performance, Male
George Benson for Give Me the Night
Best R&B Performance by a Duo or Group with Vocal
The Manhattans for "Shining Star"
Best R&B Instrumental Performance
George Benson for "Off Broadway"
Best Rhythm & Blues Song
James Mtume & Reggie Lucas (songwriters) for "Never Knew Love Like This Before" performed by Stephanie Mills

Rock
Best Rock Vocal Performance, Female
Pat Benatar for Crimes of Passion
Best Rock Vocal Performance, Male
Billy Joel for Glass Houses
Best Rock Performance by a Duo or Group with Vocal
Bob Seger & the Silver Bullet Band for Against the Wind
Best Rock Instrumental Performance
The Police for "Reggatta de Blanc"

Spoken word
Best Spoken Word, Documentary or Drama Recording
Pat Carroll for Gertrude Stein, Gertrude Stein, Gertrude Stein

Trivia
Christopher Cross became the first artist to win all four general-field awards in one night: Record of the Year, Album of the Year, Song of the Year, and Best New Artist.

References

External links
23rd Grammy Awards at the Internet Movie Database

 023
1981 music awards
1981 in New York City
Radio City Music Hall
1981 in American music
Grammy
February 1981 events in the United States